Ronnie Zabala Lazaro (born November 14, 1957) is a Gawad Urian Award-winning Filipino film and television actor, producer, casting and art director.

Biography
He has received many nominations throughout his career as an actor, nine of which were for Best Supporting Actor, and two for Best Actor (Ebolusyon in 2005 and Boatman in 1984). His films received recognition not only in the Philippines but also in international film festivals such as Cannes, Berlin and Hong Kong. He is currently working on a saga, Heremias, with Filipino director Lav Diaz, the first part of which has been shown for exhibition in the 23rd Turin Film Festival.  He has also performed in several foreign projects filmed both in the Philippines and abroad.

Lazaro is also active in television and has appeared in various soap operas, such as Kamada, winner of the Dove Awards in 1997, and Anna Luna, where he was nominated for Best Supporting Actor in 1990.

Lazaro was born in Negros Occidental, Philippines. His roots are in theatre: He co-directed an improvisational play entitled Pugakhang in 1979, and has toured nationwide to stage several plays including Hiblang Abo, which he co-produced.

Aside from his work as a film, theatre and television actor, Lazaro has had his share of achievements behind the camera. His art direction in Manila by Night won the Best Production Design Award in 1981. A self-taught photographer, he also launched in January 2005 a photo exhibit in the Museo de la Cárcel Real in Cáceres, Spain entitled Manila en las palmas de la luz (Manila in the palms of light), which ran for two months. The same exhibit was again mounted in October 2006 in Museo Perez Commendador–Leroux, coinciding with the 20th anniversary of the said museum.

The Gawad Urian Awards named Lazaro Best Actor in 2009 for his portrayal of a troubled father in the movie Yanggaw (English title: Affliction). He clinched two nominations from this same award-giving body in 2012:  he was nominated as Best Actor for the film Boundary, and for Best Supporting Actor for Manila Kingpin: The Asiong Salonga Story.

Aside from his native Hiligaynon, Ronnie speaks Tagalog, English and a little Spanish.

Filmography

Theatre
Bakeretta (Ghost Operetta) by Chong Wishing, translated by Liza Magtoto, Cultural Center of the Philippines (CCP).
Mass by F. Sionil Jose. Directed by Cris Millado, adaptation by Rody Vera. CCP.
Oraciones by Rene Villanueva, Rody Vera, Nick Pichay and Liza Magtoto, directed by Jose Estrella. CCP.
Pinoy Agonistes by Nick Joaquin, directed by Nonon Padilla. CCP.
Hiblang Abo by Rene Villanueva, directed by Spanky Manikan and Pen Medina.
Piglas by Mikhail Bulgakov, translated by Onie de Leon. Directed by Nonon Padilla. CCP.
Ulo ni Pancho Villa by Dennis Marasigan, CCP.
Tatlong Parusa, Isang Sentensiya by Pedro Calderon de la Barca, translated by J.B. Capino. Directed by Nonon Padilla. CCP.
Neo Filipino (Dance Poetry), directed by Denissa Reyes and Agnes Locsin. CCP.
Ang Propeta (Musical), written and directed by Paulo Mercado. Music Museum.
Ibon sa Lawa by Anton Chekov, translated by Jose Maria Matute. Directed by Nonon Padilla. CCP.
And St. Louis Loves Dem Pilipinos by Floy Quintos, directed by Tony Mabesa. University of the Philippines.
Katipunan by Boni Ilagan, directed by Tony Espejo. Philippine International Convention Center.
Kanser by Jomar Fleras, directed by Jun Pablo and Tony Espejo.
Lorenzo Ruiz (1989), directed by Tony Espejo.
Martir de Golgota, directed by Lou Veloso. Sta. Ana, Makati.
Ang Munting Prinsipe, adaptation of The Little Prince by Antoine de Saint-Exupéry. Directed by Tony Espejo. Metropolitan Theater.
Bien Aliktad, directed by Joel Lamangan. CCP.
Sino Ba Kayo?, directed by Armand Sta. Ana. Intramuros.
Kuwentong Katawa-tawa, adaptation of a work by Armand Salacrou. Directed by Ray Ventura. Philam Life Theater.
Esprit de Corps, directed by Susan Ceneza. CCP.
Inspired Madness (Dance), directed by Peque Gallaga. CCP.
Sa Kaluoy Sang Diyos (Skin of our Teeth), directed by Peque Gallaga. St. Scholastica's College Manila.
Pugakhang, directed by Peque Gallaga and Ronnie Lazaro. University of St. La Salle, formerly La Salle College, Bacolod.
Ang Manugpatigayon, directed by Peque Gallaga. University of St. La Salle.
A Funny Thing Happened on the Way to the Forum, directed by Peque Gallaga. University of St. La Salle.
The King and I, adaptation of the classical Rodgers and Hammerstein play. Directed by Peque Gallaga. University of St. La Salle.
Ang Baylarina (An Ilonggo Adaptation), directed by Manny Julian. University of St. La Salle.

Film
1977 The Captive Virgins ... Hermes
1978 Wake Up, Maruja ... Vergel
1982 Oro, Plata, Mata ... Hermes Mercurio
1984 Boatman ... Felipe
1984 Joyful Mystery
1984 Batuigas II: Pasukuin si Waway ... Tosan
1985 Bilang Na ang Oras Mo
1985 Revenge for Justice ... Younger Brother
1986 Flesh Avenue
1987 Sweet Revenge ... Jimmy Lee
1989 Harimao
1989 Return from the River Kwai ... Boonrod
1990 Delta Force 2: The Colombian Connection ... Quiquina's Husband
1991 Ganti ng Api ... Conrad
1992 Narito ang Puso Ko
1992 Bayani
1994 Fortunes of War ... Border Patrol Lieutenant
1994 Massacre Files
1994 Separada ... Hector
1994 Lipa "Arandia" Massacre: Lord, Deliver Us from Evil
1995 Victim No. 1: Delia Maga (Jesus, Pray for Us!) – A Massacre in Singapore
1995 Costales ...  Kidnapper
1995 Closer to Home ... Denied Applicant (scenes deleted)
1996 Medrano
1997 Ipaglaban Mo II: The Movie ... Albert
1997 Damong Ligaw ... Andrés Bonifacio
1997 Behind Enemy Lines (1997 film) ... Airport Policeman
1998 Sa Pusod ng Dagat ... Berto
1998 Curacha ang Babaeng Walang Pahinga ... Scavenger
1998 Jose Rizal ... Don Francisco Mercado
1999 Yesterday Children ... Nonong
1999 Brokedown Palace... Security
1999 Naked Under the Moon
1999 Flower of Manila ... Ed's Father
2000 Shadows (short) ... Photographer
2001 ID ... Rodel (pilay)
2001 Radio ... Peter
2001 New Moon ... Datu Ali
2002 Hesus, Rebolusyunaryo ... Miguel Reynante
2002 Utang ni Tatang ... Al
2002 Timeless ... Mirdo B. Orbida
2002 Au bout du rouleau (TV movie) Phan
2003 Bulong sa Kawalan
2004 Astigmatism ... Manong Gerry
2004 Evolution of a Filipino Family ... Fernando
2004 Panaghóy sa Subâ: The Call of the River ... Kuwanggol
2004 The Echo ... Caretaker
2005 Ang Anak ni Brocka
2005 Ilusyon ... Pablo
2005 Sandalang Bahay ... Mang Anong
2005 Boso ... Imbestigador 2
2005 Baryoke
2005 Lasponggols
2005 Miss Pinoy
2005 Maging Akin Muli (TV movie) ... Nonoy Cruz
2005 Shake, Rattle & Roll 2k5 ... Bulag (segment "Lihim ng San Joaquin")
2006 Green Rocking Chair
2006 Heremias (Unang Aklat: Ang Alamat ng Prinsesang Bayawak) ... Heremias
2007 M.O.N.A.Y (Misteyks Obda Neyson Adres Yata) ni Mr. Shooli
2007 Tukso
2007 Ataul for Rent (International title: Casket for Hire)
2008 Ploning
2008 Namets!
2008 Affliction
2008 Love Me Again
2008 Brutus
2009 Villa Estrella
2009 Manila Skies
2009 Pandemic
2009 Yanggaw
2010 Amigo
2010 Ishmael
2011 Manila Kingpin: The Asiong Salonga Story
2012 Ang Katiwala Kuya Gimo
2012 Pridyider
2012 Ang Mga Kidnapper ni Ronnie Lazaro
2012 Captured
2012 El Presidente General Candido Tirona
2015 Heneral Luna ... Lt. Garcia
2017 Tatlong Bibe
2018 Goyo: Ang Batang Heneral ... Lt. Garcia
2019 Maria ... Greg
2021 Gensan Punch
2022 When the Waves Are Gone
2023 In My Mother's Skin

Television

Producer
2005: Sandalang Bahay (associate producer)
2009: Ang Beerhouse (associate producer)

Casting director
2010 Amigo

Art director
1980 City After Dark

Awards and nominations

References

External links

1957 births
Living people
ABS-CBN personalities
Casting directors
Filipino male film actors
Filipino male stage actors
Filipino male television actors
GMA Network personalities
Hiligaynon people
Male actors from Negros Occidental
Visayan people